is a 1965 Japanese drama film directed by Masahiro Shinoda. It is based on the novel Beauty and Sadness  by Nobel Prize winning writer Yasunari Kawabata.

Plot
Ageing writer Ōki travels to Kyoto to meet with former lover Otoko. Fifteen years ago, the married Ōki and the then still teenage Otoko had had an affair. Otoko became pregnant by him, attempted suicide after a miscarriage, and spent several months in a mental institution, while her mother tried to persuade Ōki to marry Otoko, but to no avail. Ōki later used the affair in a novel, typed up by his grieving wife Fumiko, who had learned of his infidelity by Otoko's mother. The novel, called "The Bitter Seventeen", turned out to be a bestseller.

Otoko, now a painter and art teacher, lives with a young woman, Keiko, who is both her pupil and life partner. Keiko, jealous that Otoko has never completely stopped loving Ōki, and obsessed with the idea to avenge her lover's suffering, spends the night with Ōki and later makes an appointment with his son Taichiro, intent on destroying the writer's family. While Otoko scolds Keiko for what she sees as mere egoism, Fumiko tells her husband that she suspects that the young woman is up to something.

After Taichiro and Keiko have spent the afternoon in a hotel, they go on a boating trip together. Later, Otoko is called up to come to the hotel, as Keiko has barely survived a boating accident, while Taichiro is still missing. Otoko, Ōki and his wife meet at the unconscious Keiko's bed, where Fumiko blames Otoko that she used Keiko to kill their son. After Ōki has taken the desperate Fumiko out of the room, Keiko opens her eyes, tears running down her cheeks.

Cast
 Kaoru Yachigusa as Otoko Ueno 
 Mariko Kaga as Keiko Sakami 
 Sō Yamamura as Toshio Ōki
 Haruko Sugimura as Otoko's mother
 Kei Yamamoto as Taichiro Ōki 
 Misako Watanabe as Fumiko Ōki

Awards
 1965: Asia-Pacific Film Festival Awards – Best Supporting Actress Kaoru Yachigusa

References

External links
 

1965 films
1965 drama films
Japanese drama films
Films based on Japanese novels
Films based on works by Yasunari Kawabata
Lesbian-related films
Japanese LGBT-related films
LGBT-related drama films
1965 LGBT-related films
Films scored by Toru Takemitsu
1960s Japanese films